Tuttle may refer to:

Places

Canada
 Tuttle, Alberta

United States
 Tuttle, Arkansas
 Tuttle, California
 Tuttle, Colorado
 Tuttle, Oklahoma
 Tuttle, North Dakota

Other uses
 "Tuttle" (M*A*S*H), a 1973 episode from the television series M*A*S*H
 Tuttle (surname)
 Tuttle Creek Lake, a reservoir in the U.S. state of Kansas, United States
 Tuttle Lake, a lake in the U.S. state of Minnesota
 Tuttle Publishing, founded in Tokyo in 1948

See also
 Comet Tuttle (disambiguation), several comets
 Tuttle House (disambiguation)